The 2022 United States Senate election in South Carolina was held on November 8, 2022, to elect a member of the United States Senate to represent the state of South Carolina. Incumbent Republican Senator Tim Scott won reelection to a second full term, defeating Democratic former state representative Krystle Matthews.

Scott was appointed to the U.S. Senate in 2013 by then-Governor Nikki Haley following the resignation of Jim DeMint. He won the 2014 special election to serve the remainder of DeMint's term and was then re-elected to a full six-year term in 2016 with 60.6% of the vote.

Primary elections in South Carolina were held on June 14, 2022. Scott won the Republican primary unopposed, while Catherine Fleming Bruce and Matthews faced each other in a runoff. Runoff elections were held on June 28. Matthews won the Democratic primary in a runoff.

This was the third consecutive Senate election for this seat where both major party nominees were Black. Scott has said this election would be his last.

Republican primary

Candidates

Nominee
Tim Scott, incumbent U.S. Senator (2013–present)

Withdrawn
Timothy Swain (opted to run for State House seat 121, defeated in primary)

Endorsements

Democratic primary

Candidates

Nominee
 Krystle Matthews, former state representative (2018–2022)

Eliminated in runoff
Catherine Fleming Bruce, author and activist

Eliminated in primary
 Angela Geter, former chair of the Spartanburg County Democratic Party and candidate for South Carolina House of Representatives in 2017

First round

Results

Runoff

Results

General election

Predictions

Endorsements

Polling

Results

See also 
 2022 United States Senate elections
 2022 South Carolina elections

Notes

References

External links
This Week in South Carolina | Midterm Election Recap - South Carolina ETV

Official campaign websites
 Krystle Matthews (D) for Senate
 Tim Scott (R) for Senate
 Catherine Fleming Bruce (D) for United States Senate
 https://ballotpedia.org/Angela_Geter

2022
South Carolina
United States Senate